Kurt Yaeger (born January 3, 1977) is an American actor, director and professional athlete, who is also a below-the-knee amputee.  Recent work includes roles on the CBS series NCIS and the HBO/Cinemax series Quarry.  Kurt is notable for appearing in season five of the FX series Sons of Anarchy as Greg "the Peg" and in the Rudimental music video for the UK hit single "Waiting All Night" featuring vocals from Ella Eyre.

Early life

Kurt Yaeger was born in San Francisco, California, United States (US), and was raised in South San Francisco. He currently resides in the Los Angeles area.

As a BMX rider, Yaeger gained the nickname "Crowbar" and acquired sponsors for his BMX riding, participating in tours and competing in events.

As an actor, Yaeger auditioned for a Nickelodeon/Clear Channel Communications live tour based on the popular cartoon show Rocket Power.  What he thought to be an acting role turned out to be an athletic/stunt role. On the first day of rehearsals, the director found out that his BMX talent was at a professional level and incorporated it into the show. The show briefly toured the US Midwest in spring 2002 before being canceled due to low ticket sales.  After experiencing many BMX-related injuries, he decided to go back to college to pursue a master's degree in hydrogeology. In 2006, while attending school in San Francisco, he was in a motorbike crash that resulted in multiple injuries. He hit a pole and went over a 40-foot embankment, crashing on the side of the freeway.

His left leg was amputated below the knee, his right anterior cruciate ligament and medial collateral ligament were torn, his pelvis was torn in half along with his bladder, seven vertebra were broken, his lungs collapsed, multiple ribs were broken, and he had a severe concussion. One year later, Yaeger made a full recovery, returning to his acting career.

Career

Yaeger started taking acting courses and began acquiring role after role. Some of his early work includes Michael Anderson's Tenderloin, a film about one of the most infamous neighborhoods in San Francisco. The film premiered at the Mill Valley Film Festival in October 2009. Yaeger also shares the joy of working on Dolphin Tale with Morgan Freeman, Ashley Judd and Harry Connick, Jr.; Knife Fight with Rob Lowe; War Flowers with Christina Ricci, Tom Berenger and Jason Gedrick; and the Syfy feature film Piranhaconda with Michael Madsen and Rachel Hunter.  In 2012, he appeared in a recurring role for six episodes of the highest rated FX television series Sons of Anarchy.  Late 2016 brings Yaeger to the set of Cinemax's New Series Original Quarry and to NCIS: Los Angeles for a multi-episode arc. In 2018 Yaeger was cast in CBS All Access series Tell Me a Story.  Having 2019 bringing him to star in his third separate NCIS franchise show on NCIS: New Orleans, along with The Rookie, and a spot on the fresh television drama The Village.  His list of Television and Movie credits continues to grow.

Along with his business partner Josh Gillick, Yaeger created the production company ArtistFilm. It has produced several short films and features, such as Sedona's Rule distributed by Green Apple Entertainment, Inc. They are currently working on features in the early pre-production stages and a reality TV project which has been optioned. Yaeger is also involved with the Screen Actors Guild (SAG), American Federation of Television and Radio Artists (AFTRA), and the Actors' Equity Association (AEA) Tri-Union global disability rights campaign called IAMPWD – Inclusion in the Arts & Media of People with Disabilities.  He previously served as a Chairperson on the AFTRA Los Angeles Local Performers with Disabilities Committee.

Yaeger has also volunteered his time with several organizations. He has attended several Big Sunday events for the Wounded Warrior Project and participated in the American300 Warrior Tour. Yaeger spoke at the 10th and 11th annual United Cerebral Palsy of New York City event called Women Who Care, sharing the stage with Ivanka Trump, Michelle Bachelet and many others. Yaeger was invited as a keynote speaker to the 2014 Adobe Summit in London on the subject of reinvention.  On May 14, 2014, he spoke to an abundance of tech specialists, business entrepreneurs, and introduced Rudimental during the Summit Fest that followed.  Yaeger's next feat was a run up Empire State Building in New York City on February 3, 2016.  This run was presented by Marmot on behalf of the Challenged Athletes Foundation (CAF).

Sports and affiliations

His sports comeback came not long after in the Extreme Sports genre of BMX.  He is currently the number one Adaptive BMXer in the world and participated in X Games 16 and X Games 17. Yaeger was showcased along with other adaptive athletes thanks to Adaptive Action Sports, a non-profit organization promoting Action Sports camps, events and programs for youth and young adults living with permanent physical disabilities.

In 2012, the US Paralympics Bobsled & Skeleton Team invited him to train with them in Park City in early January. They asked him back to train with them in Innsbruck, Austria in early March of that year.

2013 had Yaeger participating in a promotional BMX tour of the United Kingdom. Followed immediately by a Motorcycle tour of Africa with Touratech-USA.  He currently rides motorcycles more than BMX, both personally and as a hobby.

BMX sponsors

When Yaeger initially began training again, Etnies signed up to sponsor him, supplying shoes that allowed for an expanded experimentation with a new magnetic pedal from ProTonLocks. After he figured out how to stay on the pedals Solid Bikes and Odyssey helped him by supplying a new bike. The last obstacle was to figure out how to keep his knee from hyper-extending from the repeated impact pressures, so he turned to Ossur, who built him a CTi custom knee brace for his prosthetic leg. Other sponsors, including Freestyle Watches, Stussy, Bern Helmets, Alpine Stars, Challenged Athletes Foundation, Fox Racing, ZICO Coconut Water and more, have all backed Yaeger.

Yaeger was one of the owners of ProTonLocks, Inc., a company that makes magnetic bicycle pedals.

Filmography

Television

Movies

Producer/director

Model

References

External links 
 Official Website
 
 Athletic Reel at YouTube

American male film actors
American male television actors
BMX riders
American disabled sportspeople
American amputees
1977 births
Living people
Male actors from San Francisco
Male actors from Los Angeles
21st-century American male actors
Amputee actors